The big Mexican small-eared shrew (Cryptotis magna) is a species of mammal in the family Soricidae. It is endemic to Mexico.

References

Cryptotis
Endemic mammals of Mexico
Taxonomy articles created by Polbot
Mammals described in 1895